GARN is an American alternative energy company and manufacturer of smokeless wood-burning furnaces with integrated hydronic thermal storage.

History 
GARN pioneered wood gasification in conjunction with thermal storage in 1984, after GARN founder Martin Lunde developed the technology under a contract with the U.S. Department of Energy in the late 1970s, along with researchers Richard Snyder and James Buesing. Lunde was awarded patents in wood-fired hydronic storage in the early 1980s. 
 
In April 2015, the GARN WHS-2000 was the first ever hydronic wood heater to pass the EPA's Phase II "white tag" certification using cord wood as fuel.

References

External links 
 

Energy companies established in 1984
Heating
Companies based in Minneapolis
1984 establishments in Minnesota